Forbidden Broadway: 20th Anniversary Edition is the sixth volume in the Forbidden Broadway Cast Albums. Although there isn't a show with the same title, the CD has twenty-five of Forbidden Broadway's best songs, including eight previously unreleased tracks. It was conceived, created and written (parody lyrics) by Gerard Alessandrini.

The CD bears the label "The Ultimate Unreleased Un-Original Cast Recording," pointing out that this does not exclusively feature the original cast.  The liner notes give a retrospective of Forbidden Broadway's beginnings, as well as a gallery of photos of the original cast with the stars they mock so lovingly.

This CD returns the parodies of such shows as Ragtime, Annie, Into the Woods, Cats, Martin Guerre, and Les Misérables. Stars like Julie Andrews, Mandy Patinkin, and Patti Lupone also share the ridicule.

Featured performers
(In order of first listing in liner notes):
 Gerard Alessandrini
 Fred Barton (piano for tracks 1, 17a, 19, and 25)
 Bill Carmichael
 Nora Mae Lyng
 Chlöe Webb
 Herndon Lackey
 Brad Oscar
 Craig Wells
 Christine Pedi
 John Freedson
 Brad Ellis (piano for tracks 2, 3, 9, 10, 15, 16, 17b, and 19- 24)
 Susanne Blakeslee
 Jason Graae
 Toni DiBuono
 Tom Plotkin
 Bryan Batt
 Lori Hammel
 Edward Staudenmayer
 Michael McGrath
 Karen Murphy
 Roxie Lucas
 Phillip George
 Dorothy Kiara
 Kevin Ligon
 Linda Strasser
 Carol Channing
 Gina Kreiezmar
 Stephen Potfora
 Kristine Zbornik
 Terri White
 Philip Fortenberry (piano for tracks 4, 8, 11, 13, and 14)
 Matthew Ward (piano for tracks 5- 7 and 18)
 August Eriksmoen (piano for track 21)

Tracks
Listed here are the tracks on the CD, with the title of the number followed by the song which it parodies and the original composer.
01 Forbidden Broadway (original, Alessandrini) (volume 1)
02 The Music Man (volume 3)
Trouble in New York City ("Trouble", Wilson)
03 My Fair Lady (previously unreleased)
Import Gavotte ("Ascot Gavotte", Lerner-Lowe)
04 Annie (volume 2)
Tomorrow ("Tomorrow", Strouse-Charnin)
05 Cameron Mackintosh (volume 4)
My Souvenir Things ("My Favorite Things", Rodgers-Hammerstein)
06 Elaine Stritch (volume 4)
Stritch ("Zip!", Rodgers-Hart)
07 The Lion King (volume 5)
Circle of Mice ("Circle of Life", John-Rice)
Can You Feel the Pain Tonight? ("Can You Feel the Love Tonight?", John-Rice)
08 Patti Lupone (volume 2)
Patti Lupone ("Anything Goes", Porter)
I Get a Kick Out of Me ("I Get a Kick Out of You", Porter)
09 Martin Guerre (previously unreleased)
It's Martin Guerre ("I'm Martin Guerre", Boubil-Schönberg-Clark)
10 Julie Andrews (volume 3)
I Couldn't Hit that Note ("I Could've Danced All Night", Lerner-Lowe)
11 Into the Woods (volume 2)
Into the Words ("Into the Woods", Sondheim)
12 Chita-Rita ("America", Bernstein- Sondheim) (volume 2)
13 Mandy Patinkin (volume 2)
Somewhat Overindulgent ("Over the Rainbow", Arlen-Harburg)
14 Les Misérables (volume 2)
Les Misérables ("C'est Magnifique", Porter)
End of the Play ("End of the Day", Boubil-Schönberg)
I Dreamed a Show ("I Dreamed a Dream", Boubil-Schönberg)
Bring It Down ("Bring Him Home", Boubil-Schönberg)
15 Carol Channing (volume 3)
Imitation is the Sincerest Form of Flattery (original, Alessandrini)
16 Old Revivals ("Oklahoma!", Rodgers-Hammerstein) (previously unreleased)
17 Merman and Martin
It's De-Merman ("It's De-Lovely", Porter) (volume 1)
Old Fashioned Ballad ("Old Fashioned Wedding", Berlin) (volume 3)
18 Ragtime (volume 5)
Gagtime ("Ragtime", Flaherty-Ahrens)
A Really Long Note ("The Wheels of a Dream", Flaherty-Ahrens)
19 Sarah Brightman (previously unreleased)
Time I Said, "Goodbye" ("Con te Partirò", Sartori-Quarantotto)
20 Aspects of Love (previously unreleased)
I Sleep with Everyone ("Love Changes Everything", Lloyd Webber-Rice-Hart)
21 Screamgirls (previously unreleased)
And I Am Telling You I'm Not Screaming ("And I Am Telling You I'm Not Going", Ayen-Krieger)
22 Liza Minnelli (previously unreleased)
Liza One-Note (original, Alessandrini, based on "Johnny One-Note", Rodgers-Hart)
23 Back to Barbara ("On a Clear Day You Can See Forever", Lerner-Lowe)(volume 3)
24 Cats (previously unreleased)
I Enjoy Being a Cat ("I Enjoy Being a Girl", Rodgers-Hammerstein)
Memory ("Memory", Lloyd Webber-Eliot)
25 Fiddler on the Roof (volume 1)
Ambition ("Tradition", Bock-Harnick)

See also
 Forbidden Broadway
 Forbidden Broadway, Vol. 1
 Forbidden Broadway, Vol. 2
 Forbidden Broadway, Vol. 3
 Forbidden Hollywood
 Forbidden Broadway Strikes Back
 Forbidden Broadway Cleans Up Its Act
 Forbidden Broadway 2001: A Spoof Odyssey
 Forbidden Broadway: Special Victims Unit
 Forbidden Broadway: Rude Awakening
 Forbidden Broadway Goes to Rehab

Cast recordings
2000 compilation albums
Soundtrack compilation albums